Hybomitra shirakii is a species of horse flies in the family Tabanidae.

Distribution
China

References

Tabanidae
Diptera of Asia
Taxa named by Günther Enderlein
Insects described in 1925